Sky City is the debut studio album by Swedish band Amason, released through 20 January 2015 on INGRID.

Recording
The album was recorded at Spegeln and INGRID studios  in Stockholm, Sweden by Amason, Nille Perned, Christoffer Zakrisson and Gustav Lindelöw. All songs were written by Amason except "Elefanten", which was written by Amason and Jenny Palén. "Yellow Moon" was written and produced by Amason and Patrik Berger. The album was mastered by Bob Ludwig, Gateway Mastering Studios.

Track listing

Charts

Weekly charts

Year-end charts

References

2015 albums
Amason (band) albums